The governor of Vladimir Oblast is the highest official of Vladimir Oblast, a region in Central Russia. He heads the supreme executive body of the region — the Administration of Vladimir Oblast.

History of office 
At the initial stage of post-Soviet history of Russia, it was assumed that the elections of regional leaders would be introduced in all regions. In August 1991, Russian President Boris Yeltsin promised an early elections. For the transition period, a new institution was created — the head of the regional administration appointed by the president. On 25 September, by presidential decree, Yury Vlasov, 30-year-old deputy head of Vladimir City Executive Committee, was appointed Head of Administration of Vladimir Oblast. He became the youngest governor in Russia.

The 1st Legislative Assembly of Vladimir Oblast (March 1994 — December 1996) led by Communist Nikolay Vinogradov tried to get the Russian president to set gubernatorial elections in the region. In September 1996, Boris Yeltsin signed a decree "On the election of the head of administration of Vladimir Oblast", which allowed the election in December that year. Vlasov lost this election to Vinogradov. In 2000 the office of the head of administration was renamed into governor of Vladimir Oblast.

List of office-holders 
This is a list of governors of Vladimir Oblast:

References

 
Politics of Vladimir Oblast
Vladimir Oblast